Peter Hartmann (born 19 June 1921, Hamburg, Germany; died 14 November 2007, Geneva, Switzerland) was a Swiss sculptor known for his bronze sculptures installed in public spaces in Geneva.

Early life
Hartmann was born in Hamburg in 1921, the son of a Swiss immigrant father and a German-Danish mother.  He spent his youth in Cairo, Egypt where his father was posted for work.

Early career
Hartmann attended primary school at the International English and International German schools in Cairo.  After completing his primary educational studies, he was then sent to Germany to complete his higher education. In 1939 Hartmann obtained his baccalaureat award and had decided to become an artist. Bowing to pressure from his father, he agreed instead to study architecture in Berlin.  Hartmann's architecture studies were pre-empted by the outbreak of World War II in Europe, so, finding himself in Geneva at the end of the war, he studied sculpture with Henri Paquet.

In 1946, Hartmann returned to Cairo where he set up his first studio in his parents' garage.  He subsequently moved around Europe, spending time sculpting and studying in Florence, Positano and Paris.  He finally settled in Geneva in 1950, where he did the bulk of his work.

Later career
Hartmann worked in Geneva from 1950 until the end of his career in the late 1990s.

In 1957 he received his first commission for a large work - the Virgin for L'Église du Christ-Roi in Petit Lancy.

In 1959 he had his first solo exhibition, which was followed by many solo and collective shows in Geneva,  and throughout the French part of Switzerland.

In 1968 he received his most important commission which was the statue of Charles Pictet de Rochemont, now installed on the Promenade de la Treille in Geneva.

Hartmann supplemented his sculpting income as a restorer at the Musée d'Art et d'Histoire.

Later life and death
Hartmann continued his activities as a sculptor until the end of the 1990s when he was stricken by Parkinson's disease, which gradually prevented to him from fully working with his hands.

Hartmann died in Geneva on November 14, 2007.

Works

Dietesheim Gallery
Hartmann's works were showcased in a 1979 exhibition at the Dietesheim gallery, Neuchâtel.  A reviewer of the exhibition said
Peter Hartmann, has a prestigious manner in imposing upon his works, his sense of beauty and his impassioned style. His works denotes a nobility of expression whereby this traditional approach from where a sensuality and simplicity bore,  makes Peter Hartmann a significant sculptor. There is no audacity in the sculptures, but only the perception of the rhythm and a subtle suggestion of the movement that brings his characters resulting from mythology to reality. A research of the essence is what was achieved. - Journal du Jura

Individual exhibitions 
 Gallery Motte, Geneva, 1964
 Gallery Vanier, Geneva, 1968
 Gallery Vanier, Geneva, 1975
 Gallery Vanier, Geneva, 1975
 Gallery Steingasser, Carouge, 1976
 Gallery André Buchs, Geneva, 1979
 Gallery Dietesheim, Neuchâtel, 1981
 Gallery des Platanes, Carouge, 1987
 Gallery Cluny, Geneva, 1991
 Gallery La Collection, Vesenaz, 1994
 Gallery du Simplon, Vevey, 1998
 Retrospective of the Works of Peter Hartmann, Gallery Castellino Fine Arts, Geneva, 2008

Collective exhibitions
 Gallery George Moos, 1952
 Oeuvre Geneve (Exhibition of the Works of Geneva), 1961
 Sculpteurs de Geneve, Parc des Eaux Vives, Geneva, 1962
 Sculpteurs de Geneve, Parc des Eaux Vives, Geneva, 1963
 Sculpteurs Genevois, Club Migros, Geneva, 1965
 Sculpteurs de Geneve, Parc des Eaux Vives, Geneva, 1966
 Sculpture en Plein Air, Montreux, 1969
 Sculpture en Plein Air, Montreux, 1970
 Musée d'Art et d'Histoire, Geneva, 1984
 Sculptures of Grand Lancy, Geneva, 1985
 Jardin Botanique, Geneva

Permanent installations 
Many of Hartmann's works are permanently installed in various public spaces around Geneva.  The most significant of these are shown below.

In media
Hartmann has been the topic of a documentary film titled Peter Hartmann by French film directors Patrick Constantin and Florent Saccon.

External links 
 https://artuk.org/discover/artworks/saint-cecilia-303144#
 Tribute website of Peter Hartmann by Jacelyn Parry in Italian, English, French & German.

20th-century Swiss sculptors
1921 births
2007 deaths
20th-century Swiss male artists